Robert Watson Grimmer (October 25, 1866 – November 4, 1948) was a merchant and politician from New Brunswick, Canada. He represented Charlotte County in the Legislative Assembly of New Brunswick from 1915 to 1920 and Charlotte in the House of Commons of Canada from 1921 to 1930 as a Conservative member.

He was born in Saint Stephen, New Brunswick, the son of William Wey Grimmer and Margaret Wilson. In 1859, he married Mary B. Harrison. Grimmer served on the town council for Saint Stephen and was mayor from 1908 to 1909. He also served on the St. Stephen Water Commission and as a school trustee. Grimmer was a Mason and a member of the Knights of Pythias.

Electoral history

References 
 
 Canadian Parliamentary Guide, 1926, AL Normandin

1866 births
1948 deaths
Conservative Party of Canada (1867–1942) MPs
Members of the House of Commons of Canada from New Brunswick
Mayors of places in New Brunswick
People from St. Stephen, New Brunswick
Progressive Conservative Party of New Brunswick MLAs